SeaDream I is a yacht-style  cruise ship operated by SeaDream Yacht Club since 2001. In service since 1984, she was formerly named Sea Goddess I and operated for Sea Goddess Line and Cunard.

Coronavirus quarantine 

On 11 November 2020, the Government of Barbados received a request for assistance from SeaDream I  with reports of a suspected positive case of COVID-19 on board, Six passengers aboard SeaDream I were later confirmed to have been infected with COVID-19. Subsequently there was an additional case recorded. On 15 November it was reported that one crew member had also tested positive. On 17 November it was reported that seven guests and two crew members aboard SeaDream 1 tested positive for COVID-19. SeaDream canceled all remaining 2020 cruises following the outbreak.

References

External links

SeaDream Yacht Club – official site
 Sea Goddess I history on Chris Frame's Cunard Page.

1983 ships
Cruise ships
Ships built in Helsinki
Ships of SeaDream Yacht Club
Cruise ships involved in the COVID-19 pandemic
Wärtsilä